David Frank Koch (born 24 October 1949) is an Australian politician. Born in Coleraine, Victoria, he was a farmer from 1973 to 2001, when he became a real estate agent. He held numerous local positions and was a Wannon Shire Councillor from 1987–1994, serving as President in 1991. In 2002, he was elected to the Victorian Legislative Council as a Liberal member for Western Province. In 2006, Koch was elected as a member for Western Victoria Region.

References

1949 births
Living people
Liberal Party of Australia members of the Parliament of Victoria
Members of the Victorian Legislative Council
People from Coleraine, Victoria
21st-century Australian politicians